Trinity Episcopal Church (also known as St. John's Parish) is a historic church at 703 West 3rd Avenue (corner of Oak Street) in Pine Bluff, Arkansas.  Its congregation meets in a handsome brick Gothic Revival structure, with a square buttressed tower and buttressed side walls with lancet-arched stained glass windows.  The church was built 1866-70 for a church congregation organized in 1860 by the Rev. Robert Trimble.  Initially named St. John's, it was renamed Trinity after Trimble received guidance from members of the Trinity Church in New York City.  It is unique in Arkansas as having a burial chamber under its chancel; it is that of early parishioner Cornelia Bell Roane, who died in 1862.  It is an active member of the Episcopal Diocese of Arkansas.

The building was listed on the National Register of Historic Places in 1974.

See also
National Register of Historic Places listings in Jefferson County, Arkansas

References

External links
Trinity Church web site

1866 establishments in Arkansas
19th-century Episcopal church buildings
Buildings and structures in Pine Bluff, Arkansas
Churches completed in 1866
Churches in Jefferson County, Arkansas
Churches on the National Register of Historic Places in Arkansas
Episcopal church buildings in Arkansas
Gothic Revival church buildings in Arkansas
National Register of Historic Places in Pine Bluff, Arkansas